Katrin Korfmann (1971) is a German artist, currently living and working in Amsterdam, The Netherlands.

Life and work 
Korfmann studied at the Rietveld Academie in Amsterdam, where she specialized in photography and continued her research with residencies at the Rijksakademie van beeldende kunsten in Amsterdam, Cittadellarte in Biella and the Chinese European Art Centre in Xiamen, China.

Owing to her background in photography, Katrin Korfmann’s work in various media – photo-works, videos and installations – is concerned with concepts of framing, perspective, and the social dimensions of perception, and pushes the boundaries of photography and representation.

An important determinant in her work are observations of specific public places, made visible through the presentation of different sequential incidents that have been registered within a given period and location, in one single spatial arrangement. The issue of responsibility for the existence of an image, the choice of the right moment and the framing that determines an image also play an important role in her work. Korfmann’s work maybe characterized by a formal level of composition, structure and spatiotemporal experience, that is aimed at the registration and investigation of social constructions and behavior in public space.

Since the late 1990s her work has been exhibited internationally in galleries, museums, alternative art institutions and public spaces. Her work is represented in numerous private and public international collections.  She won several prizes for her work, including Radostar Prize (CH), Prix de Rome (2nd prize) and the Esther Kroon Award (NL) and received grants from international institutions like Robert Bosch and Würth Foundation, Akademie der Künste Berlin (DE) and Mondriaan Fund (NL).

Selected public and corporate collections 

 Art Collection Ministry of Foreign Affairs, NL
 AMC Art Collection, NL
 Bouwfonds Art Collection Rabo Real Estate Group, NL
 ING Art Collection, NL
 Twitter, US
 Fotomuseum The Hague, NL
 VU Medical Centrum Art Collection, NL
 Aegon Art Collectione, NL
 Würth Foundation, DE
 European Patent Office, NL
 Van Zoetendaal Art Collection, NL
 Robert Bosch Foundation, DE
 ARTIUM Centro-Museo Vasco de Arte Contemporáneo, E
 Ymere Art Collection, NL
 Balticgruppen, SE
 LeasePlan Corporation Art Collection, NL
 Stockholm County Council, SE

Publications (monography) 
 2014	Ensembles assembled, 112 pages, full color, 17 x 23 cm, published by Onomatopee, NL
 2010	KATRIN KORFMANN 200/2010, ,128 pages, full color, 32 x 24 cm, published by d ́jonge Hond, NL
 2006	DL81 B-767-300ER, 40 pages, full color, 19 x 15 cm, published by Akademie der Künste, DE
 2005	Blue Octagon, 160 pages, full color, 6 x 13 cm
 2004	Katrin Korfmann, 32 pages, full color 19 x 15 cm, published by Carl Berg Gallery / Art Affairs, US / NL

References

External links 
Katrin Korfmann - Art Affairs
Penitentiaire Inrichting Zaanstad
VCBN
The Guardian
Huffington Post
Financial Times
LensCulture

1971 births
Living people
Photographers from Berlin
German women photographers
20th-century German women artists
21st-century German women artists
German expatriates in the Netherlands
20th-century women photographers
21st-century women photographers